Letart Island is a forested bar island on the Ohio River in Mason County, West Virginia. It is located between the towns of Letart, West Virginia and Letart Falls, Ohio. Letart Island is a part of the Ohio River Islands National Wildlife Refuge.\

See also 
List of islands of West Virginia

References

River islands of West Virginia
Landforms of Mason County, West Virginia
Islands of the Ohio River